The Oca-Ancón Fault System is a complex of geological faults located in northeastern Colombia and northwestern Venezuela near the Caribbean Sea. The Oca-Ancón Fault System is part of the diffuse boundary between the Caribbean Plate and the South American Plate. The movement rate of the Oca-Ancón Fault System is estimated at  each year, more than most Venezuelan faults.

Oca Fault segment 
It forms the northern boundary of the Sierra Nevada de Santa Marta and cuts through the Serranía del Perijá continuing into Venezuela.

References

Bibliography 
 
 
 
 

Seismic faults of Colombia
Seismic faults of Venezuela
Strike-slip faults
Active faults
Faults
Faults
Faults
Venezuelan Coastal Range
Colombia–Venezuela border